This is a list of 331 species in Myllocerus, a genus of oriental broad-nosed weevils in the family Curculionidae.

Myllocerus species

 Myllocerus abstersus (Pascoe, 1870) c g
 Myllocerus abyssinicus Hustache, 1922 c g
 Myllocerus acaciae Hoffmann, 1961 c g
 Myllocerus aeruginosus Lea, 1925 c g
 Myllocerus aidebus Hustache, 1934 c g
 Myllocerus alboscutellatus Hustache, 1934 c g
 Myllocerus alternans Voss, 1932 c g
 Myllocerus amblyrhinus Lea, 1905 c g
 Myllocerus anamalainus Marshall, 1916 c g
 Myllocerus andrewesi Marshall, 1916 c g
 Myllocerus angolanus Hustache, 1923 c g
 Myllocerus angulatipes Marshall, 1916 c g
 Myllocerus angustibasis Lea, 1914 c g
 Myllocerus anoplus Lea, 1915 c g
 Myllocerus aphthosus Pascoe, 1869 c g
 Myllocerus aristatus Boheman, 1834 c g
 Myllocerus armipectus Lea, 1914 c g
 Myllocerus armipes Lea, 1925 c g
 Myllocerus ashi Lea, 1917 c g
 Myllocerus athianus Marshall, 1944 c g
 Myllocerus atjehensis Ritsema, 1876 c g
 Myllocerus auriceps Fåhraeus, 1871 c g
 Myllocerus aurifex Pascoe, 1869 c g
 Myllocerus australis Boisduval, 1835 c g
 Myllocerus bacchus Voss, 1949 c g
 Myllocerus baeodontomerus Lea, 1915 c g
 Myllocerus basicollis Lea, 1911 c g
 Myllocerus bayeri Hustache, 1924 c g
 Myllocerus bechynei (Voss, 1956) c g
 Myllocerus benignus Faust, 1892 c g
 Myllocerus bhutanensis Nathan, 1992 c g
 Myllocerus bidentatus Pic, 1926 c g
 Myllocerus bifasciatipennis Lea, 1925 c g
 Myllocerus bilineater Lea, 1915 c g
 Myllocerus blandus Faust, 1894 c g
 Myllocerus boranus Gestro, 1895 c g
 Myllocerus boviei Marshall, 1916 c g
 Myllocerus bozasi Hustache, 1922 c g
 Myllocerus brevicollis Boheman, 1842 c g
 Myllocerus brevirostris Marshall, 1941 c g
 Myllocerus brunneus Matsumura, 1910 c g
 Myllocerus calosicollis Hustache, 1934 c g
 Myllocerus camerunensis Hustache, 1932 c g
 Myllocerus canalicornis Lea, 1909 c g
 Myllocerus canaliculatus Boheman, 1843 c g
 Myllocerus canalistriatus Ramamurthy & Ghai, 1988 c g
 Myllocerus canoxoides Kono, 1930 c g
 Myllocerus cardoni Marshall, 1916 c g
 Myllocerus carinatus Lea, 1904 c g
 Myllocerus caspius Stierlin, 1883 c g
 Myllocerus castor Lea, 1909 c g
 Myllocerus catechu Marshall, 1913 c g
 Myllocerus celatus (Voss, 1974) c g
 Myllocerus cephalotes Hustache, 1924 c g
 Myllocerus championi Ramamurthy & Ghai, 1998 c g
 Myllocerus chaunoderus Lea, 1925 c g
 Myllocerus chevalieri Hustache, 1921 c g
 Myllocerus chobauti Desbrochers des Loges, 1897 c g
 Myllocerus cinerascens Pascoe, 1869 c g
 Myllocerus cinereidorsum Desbrochers des Loges, 1903 c g
 Myllocerus circumcinctus Hustache, 1922 c g
 Myllocerus clanculus Voss, 1962 c g
 Myllocerus coimbatorensis Ramamurthy & Ghai, 1988 c g
 Myllocerus confinis Lea, 1914 c g
 Myllocerus congoanus Hustache, 1921 c g
 Myllocerus conoixoides Kono, 1930 c g
 Myllocerus conradti Hustache, 1932 c g
 Myllocerus consocius Marshall, 1916 c g
 Myllocerus conspersus Marshall, 1916 c g
 Myllocerus constricticollis Lea, 1914 c g
 Myllocerus corycaeus Boheman, 1843 c g
 Myllocerus crinitus Marshall, 1916 c g
 Myllocerus curtipennis Pic, 1903 c g
 Myllocerus curvicornis (Fabricius, 1792) c g
 Myllocerus cyrtops Lea, 1914 c g
 Myllocerus dalbergiae Ramamurthy & Ghai, 1988 c g
 Myllocerus damascenus Miller, 1861 c g
 Myllocerus darwini Blackburn, 1889 c g
 Myllocerus debilis Fairmaire, 1892 c g
 Myllocerus decipiens Lea, 1925 c g
 Myllocerus decorsei Hustache, 1920 c g
 Myllocerus decretus Pascoe, 1869 c g
 Myllocerus delicatulus (Fåhraeus, 1871) c g
 Myllocerus denigrator Hustache, 1936 c g
 Myllocerus dentifer (Fabricius, 1792) c g
 Myllocerus desquamatus Marshall, 1916 c g
 Myllocerus discolor Boheman, 1834 c g
 Myllocerus doddi Lea, 1914 c g
 Myllocerus dohrni Faust, 1890 c g
 Myllocerus dorsatus (Fabricius, 1798) c g
 Myllocerus dorsocinnamomeus (Voss, 1962) c g
 Myllocerus durus (Voss, 1937) c g
 Myllocerus echinarius Marshall, 1916 c g
 Myllocerus echinatus Lea, 1905 c g
 Myllocerus ekonaensis Hustache, 1938 c g
 Myllocerus elegans Lea, 1905 c g
 Myllocerus elendeensis Hustache, 1935 c g
 Myllocerus equinus Ramamurthy & Ghai, 1988 c g
 Myllocerus erinaceus (Faust, 1892) c g
 Myllocerus erlangeri (Voss, 1949) c g
 Myllocerus evasus Marshall, 1916 c g
 Myllocerus exilis Lea, 1905 c g
 Myllocerus eximius Boheman, 1834 c g
 Myllocerus exoletus (Voss, 1958) c g
 Myllocerus fabricii Guerin-Meneville, 1843 c g
 Myllocerus fallaciosus (Voss, 1958) c g
 Myllocerus fotedari Ahmad, 1974 c g
 Myllocerus foveiceps Lea, 1909 c g
 Myllocerus foveicollis Voss, 1932 c g
 Myllocerus foveifrons Lea, 1911 c g
 Myllocerus fringilla Faust, 1897 c g
 Myllocerus fugitivus Lea, 1914 c g
 Myllocerus fuscomaculatus Lea, 1915 c g
 Myllocerus ganalensis Gestro, 1895 c g
 Myllocerus ginfushanensis Voss, 1933 c g
 Myllocerus glaucinus Pascoe, 1869 c g
 Myllocerus gracilis Marshall, 1916 c g
 Myllocerus grahami Ramamurthy & Ghai, 1998 c g
 Myllocerus guineaensis (Voss, 1949) c g
 Myllocerus guttulus Matsumura, 1910 c g
 Myllocerus hampsoni Ramamurthy & Ghai, 1988 c g
 Myllocerus herbaceus Pascoe, 1869 c g
 Myllocerus herbivorus Lea, 1925 c g
 Myllocerus hilleri Faust, 1889 i
 Myllocerus hilli Lea, 1914 c g
 Myllocerus hinnulus Faust, 1894 c g
 Myllocerus hispidus Marshall, 1916 c g
 Myllocerus horridulus Marshall, 1944 c g
 Myllocerus hustachei Lona, 1936 c g
 Myllocerus ignavus Marshall, 1916 c g
 Myllocerus impallescens Marshall, 1916 c g
 Myllocerus impeditus Hustache, 1932 c g
 Myllocerus impressicollis Marshall, 1916 c g
 Myllocerus impressithorax Hustache, 1924 c g
 Myllocerus improvidus Marshall, 1916 c g
 Myllocerus incanus Voss, 1956 c g
 Myllocerus incertus Marshall, 1947 c g
 Myllocerus incisicollis (Lea, 1909) c g
 Myllocerus indigoferae Hoffmann, 1962 c g
 Myllocerus ineptus Marshall, 1916 c g
 Myllocerus inermipes Lea, 1929 c g
 Myllocerus inermis Aurivillius, 1913 c g
 Myllocerus infaustus Marshall, 1946 c g
 Myllocerus inflatus (Voss, 1937) c g
 Myllocerus inquietus Voss, 1937 c g
 Myllocerus intercoxalis Lea, 1914 c g
 Myllocerus interruptus Faust, 1895 c g
 Myllocerus kaeshoveni Marshall, 1926 c g
 Myllocerus kalukembensis Hustache, 1935 c g
 Myllocerus kankundanus (Voss, 1962) c g
 Myllocerus kashmirensis Marshall, 1916 c g
 Myllocerus katanganus Hustache, 1934 c g
 Myllocerus khayesicus Hustache, 1932 c g
 Myllocerus laetivirens Marshall, 1916 c g
 Myllocerus lateralis Chevrolat, 1882 c g
 Myllocerus latibasis Lea, 1914 c g
 Myllocerus laticollis Lea, 1905 c g
 Myllocerus lecideosus (Pascoe, 1870) c g
 Myllocerus lefroyi Marshall, 1916 c g
 Myllocerus liesenfeldti Voss, 1959 c g
 Myllocerus lineaticollis (Boheman, 1843) c g
 Myllocerus lineatus (Marshall, 1941) c g
 Myllocerus lodosi Osella, 1977 c g
 Myllocerus longicornis (Pascoe, 1869) c g
 Myllocerus longipilis Hustache, 1922 c g
 Myllocerus longus Lea, 1914 c g
 Myllocerus lucens Marshall, 1943 c g
 Myllocerus luctuosus Desbrochers, 1891 c g
 Myllocerus luridus (Voss, 1949) c g
 Myllocerus maculatus (Blackburn, 1892) c g
 Myllocerus madurensis Marshall, 1916 c g
 Myllocerus magnificus Hustache, 1924 c g
 Myllocerus manipurensis Marshall, 1916 c g
 Myllocerus marshalli Lona, 1936 c g
 Myllocerus massaicus Hustache, 1921 c g
 Myllocerus mastersi Lea, 1911 c g
 Myllocerus mateui Hoffmann, 1964 c g
 Myllocerus mayarami Ramamurthy & Ghai, 1988 c g
 Myllocerus melvillensis Lea, 1914 c g
 Myllocerus menoni Ramamurthy & Ghai, 1988 c g
 Myllocerus methneri (Voss, 1949) c g
 Myllocerus micros Hustache, 1934 c g
 Myllocerus minusculus Lea, 1914 c g
 Myllocerus mirabilis Lea, 1911 c g
 Myllocerus morio Boheman, 1834 c g
 Myllocerus multimaculatus Lea, 1911 c g
 Myllocerus mundus Voss, 1932 c g
 Myllocerus mystacinus Marshall, 1944 c g
 Myllocerus nasutus Pascoe, 1869 c g
 Myllocerus necopinus Marshall, 1916 c g
 Myllocerus nemorosus Hustache, 1924 c g
 Myllocerus neosordidus Ramamurthy & Ghai, 1988 c g
 Myllocerus nepalensis Ramamurthy & Ghai, 1988 c g
 Myllocerus niger Aurivillius, 1912 c g
 Myllocerus nigrosuturatus Marshall, 1916 c g
 Myllocerus niveus Lea, 1905 c g
 Myllocerus nodicollis Marshall, 1916 c g
 Myllocerus nuristanicus Voss, 1959 c g
 Myllocerus obliquifasciatus Lea, 1917 c g
 Myllocerus obockianus Reitter, 1906 c g
 Myllocerus obscurus Lea, 1925 c g
 Myllocerus ochraceus Magnano, 2009 c g
 Myllocerus paetus Marshall, 1916 c g
 Myllocerus pallidicolor Hustache, 1934 c g
 Myllocerus parvicollis Voss, 1949 c g
 Myllocerus pauculus Voss, 1934 c g
 Myllocerus pauper Faust, 1897 c g
 Myllocerus pennatus Formánek, 1922 c g
 Myllocerus perarmatus Lea, 1929 c g
 Myllocerus perilis Voss, 1965 c g
 Myllocerus persimilis Hustache, 1921 c g
 Myllocerus perversus Hustache, 1921 c g
 Myllocerus phariseus Hustache, 1922 c g
 Myllocerus pictus Lea, 1925 c g
 Myllocerus pilifer Faust, 1897 c g
 Myllocerus planoculis Marshall, 1916 c g
 Myllocerus plebejus Hartmann, 1904 c g
 Myllocerus plutus Voss, 1958 c g
 Myllocerus pollux Lea, 1909 c g
 Myllocerus polylineatus Hustache, 1921 c g
 Myllocerus postfasciatus Marshall, 1916 c g
 Myllocerus posthi (Hustache, 1921) c g
 Myllocerus posttibialis Voss, 1962 c g
 Myllocerus pracuae Faust, 1891 c g
 Myllocerus pretiosus Faust, 1897 c g
 Myllocerus procerus Faust, 1897 c g
 Myllocerus prosabulosus Ramamurthy & Ghai, 1988 c g
 Myllocerus prosternalis Lea, 1914 c g
 Myllocerus proteus Hustache, 1929 c g
 Myllocerus pruinosus Blanchard, 1853 c g
 Myllocerus pteroderes Lea, 1929 c g
 Myllocerus pubescens Faust, 1894 c g
 Myllocerus pulchellus Formánek, 1922 c g
 Myllocerus pumilus Marshall, 1916 c g
 Myllocerus quadricolor Lea, 1917 c g
 Myllocerus raddensis Pic, 1904 c g
 Myllocerus ravillus Voss, 1961 c g
 Myllocerus reitteri Kirsch, 1879 c g
 Myllocerus retratiens Walker, 1859 c g
 Myllocerus richardi Nathan in Ramamurthy et al., 1992 c g
 Myllocerus robusticeps Pic, 1903 c g
 Myllocerus rodhaini Hustache, 1924 c g
 Myllocerus rosae Ramamurthy & Ghai, 1988 c g
 Myllocerus roscidus Marshall, 1916 c g
 Myllocerus roseus Hustache, 1922 c g
 Myllocerus ruandanus Hustache, 1934 c g
 Myllocerus rubiginosus Hustache, 1922 c g
 Myllocerus rufescens Ramamurthy & Ghai, 1988 c g
 Myllocerus rugicollis Lea, 1905 c g
 Myllocerus rusticus Pascoe, 1869 c g
 Myllocerus sabulosus Marshall, 1916 c g
 Myllocerus salemensis Marshall, 1943 c g
 Myllocerus satunini Suvorov, 1915 c g
 Myllocerus scapularis Roelofs, 1880 c g
 Myllocerus schimperi Hustache, 1936 c g
 Myllocerus scitulus Lea, 1925 c g
 Myllocerus sericeus Faust, 1897 c g
 Myllocerus setistriatus Lea, 1914 c g
 Myllocerus setosus Kono, 1930 c g
 Myllocerus setulifer Desbrochers des Loges, 1899 c g
 Myllocerus severini Marshall, 1916 c g
 Myllocerus seydeli Voss, 1949 c g
 Myllocerus sibiricus Tournier, 1879 c g
 Myllocerus simplex Faust, 1897 c g
 Myllocerus singularis (Voss, 1949) c g
 Myllocerus sitonoides Hoffmann, 1963 c g
 Myllocerus smaragdinus Marshall, 1916 c g
 Myllocerus sordidus Lea, 1905 c g
 Myllocerus speciosus Blackburn, 1894 c g
 Myllocerus spectator Marshall, 1916 c g
 Myllocerus spinicollis Marshall, 1941 c g
 Myllocerus spurius Faust, 1895 c g
 Myllocerus squamicornis Lea, 1914 c g
 Myllocerus stolzi Voss, 1949 c g
 Myllocerus strangulaticollis Magnano, 2009 c g
 Myllocerus striatifrons Marshall, 1941 c g
 Myllocerus strigilatus (Voss, 1937) c g
 Myllocerus suavis Faust, 1897 c g
 Myllocerus subcostatus Kolenati, 1858 c g
 Myllocerus subcruciatus Voss, 1934 c g
 Myllocerus subglaber Faust, 1897 c g
 Myllocerus subglaucus Marshall, 1916 c g
 Myllocerus subnubilis (Voss, 1952) c g
 Myllocerus subrostralis Lea, 1914 c g
 Myllocerus sulcicornis Lea, 1915 c g
 Myllocerus superelegans Hustache, 1932 c g
 Myllocerus susainathani Nathan in Ramamurthy et al., 1992 c g
 Myllocerus suspiciens Marshall, 1916 c g
 Myllocerus suturalis Lea, 1905 c g
 Myllocerus suturellus (Voss, 1949) c g
 Myllocerus szetschuanus Voss, 1933 c g
 Myllocerus tatei Blackburn, 1896 c g
 Myllocerus tavetanus Hustache, 1929 c g
 Myllocerus taylori Lea, 1909 c g
 Myllocerus terreus (Pascoe, 1869) c g
 Myllocerus tessellatus Aurivillius, 1912 c g
 Myllocerus thandiyaniensis Rizvi, Ahmed et Naz, 2002 c g
 Myllocerus thompsoni Ramamurthy & Ghai, 1988 c g
 Myllocerus tibialis (Voss, 1949) c g
 Myllocerus togoensis (Voss, 1949) c g
 Myllocerus torridus Blackburn, 1894 c g
 Myllocerus transmarinus (Herbst, 1795) c g
 Myllocerus trepidus Pascoe, 1885 c g
 Myllocerus tricarinirostris Lea, 1925 c g
 Myllocerus trifasciatus Voss, 1932 c g
 Myllocerus trifolii Hoffmann, 1964 c g
 Myllocerus trilineatus Lea, 1905 c g
 Myllocerus trisinuatus Lea, 1929 c g
 Myllocerus tristis Lea, 1914 c g
 Myllocerus tusicollis Marshall, 1916 c g
 Myllocerus uamensis (Voss, 1949) c g
 Myllocerus undatus Marshall, 1916 c g
 Myllocerus undecimpustulatus Faust, J., 1891 c g b  (sri lanka weevil)
 Myllocerus uniformis (Voss, 1949) c g
 Myllocerus upembaensis Voss, 1962 c g
 Myllocerus usitatus Lea, 1904 c g
 Myllocerus valparensis Ramamurthy & Ghai, 1988 c g
 Myllocerus vanderijsti Hustache, 1924 c g
 Myllocerus varius Lea, 1914 c g
 Myllocerus veterator Hustache, 1936 c g
 Myllocerus villosipennis Lea, 1917 c g
 Myllocerus virens Voss, 1949 c g
 Myllocerus viridanus (Fabricius, 1775) c g
 Myllocerus viridimicans Lea, 1917 c g
 Myllocerus viridiornatus Voss, 1934 c g
 Myllocerus viridipictus (Lea, 1909) c g
 Myllocerus viridis Aurivillius, 1912 c g
 Myllocerus vonguensis Hustache, 1932 c g
 Myllocerus yeboensis Hustache, 1934 c g
 Myllocerus zeylanicus Marshall, 1916 c g
 Myllocerus zopherus Lea, 1917 c g

sri lanka weevil
Data sources: i = ITIS, c = Catalogue of Life, g = GBIF, b = Bugguide.net

References

Mycomya